Harpers Ferry station is a historic railway station in Harpers Ferry, West Virginia.  It is currently served by Amtrak's Capitol Limited as well as MARC commuter service. Built by the Baltimore and Ohio Railroad, the station is part of the Harpers Ferry Historic District.

It is a wooden frame Victorian style building, dating from 1889. It sits on buried foundations of original Harpers Ferry armory buildings.

In 2007, the station was rededicated following a $2.2 million renovation, which included restoration of the station's tower.

Station layout
The station is not compliant with the Americans with Disabilities Act of 1990.

See also
 B & O Railroad Potomac River Crossing

References

External links

Harper's Ferry Amtrak-MARC Station (USA Rail Guide -- Train Web)

Amtrak stations in West Virginia
Brunswick Line
Harpers Ferry, West Virginia
Former Baltimore and Ohio Railroad stations
MARC Train stations
Buildings and structures in Harpers Ferry, West Virginia
Victorian architecture in West Virginia
Transportation in Jefferson County, West Virginia
Railway stations in West Virginia
Railway stations in the United States opened in 1889
Historic American Engineering Record in West Virginia
Historic district contributing properties in West Virginia
National Register of Historic Places in Jefferson County, West Virginia